Lazar Hristov (born 18 March 1925) was a Bulgarian footballer. He played in three matches for the Bulgaria national football team from 1947 to 1952. He was also part of Bulgaria's squad for the 1952 Summer Olympics, but he did not play in any matches.

References

External links
 

1925 births
Possibly living people
Bulgarian footballers
Bulgaria international footballers
Association football midfielders
FC Lokomotiv 1929 Sofia players
Footballers from Sofia